Henri Delabarre was a French rower. He competed in two events at the 1900 Summer Olympics.

References

External links

Year of birth missing
Year of death missing
French male rowers
Olympic rowers of France
Rowers at the 1900 Summer Olympics
Place of birth missing
Place of death missing